Jonathan Goldstein is an American actor, director, and musician who is best known for his role as Josh’s father, Walter Nichols, in the Nickelodeon sitcom Drake & Josh that aired from 2004–2007.

Career
Some of his other television credits include The Riches, Buffy the Vampire Slayer, NCIS, Heroes, Grey's Anatomy, Once and Again and  The Electric Company. He also directed three episodes of the Nickelodeon sitcom iCarly starring his former Drake & Josh co-star Miranda Cosgrove.

Goldstein was also a founding member of Los Angeles's Sacred Fools Theater Company and served as one of its Artistic Directors during the theater's inaugural season.

In recent years, Goldstein has taken to traveling to Bowling Green, Kentucky during the summer to direct amateur youth theater. So far, he has directed local productions of Romeo and Juliet,  Pride and Prejudice, and The Crucible.

Filmography

Film

Television

Video games

References

External links

20th-century American male actors
21st-century American male actors
American male film actors
American male television actors
Living people
Year of birth missing (living people)